Verus (died 219) was a Roman usurper.

Verus was a centurion, who had successfully raised to the rank of Roman Senator. He was the commander of the Legio III Gallica, a legion located in Syria, which supported Elagabalus bid for power (218).

Soon, however, the soldiers disenchanted with the reign of Elagabalus, and in the winter 218–219 Verus took the opportunity, proclaiming himself Roman Emperor, and leading the rebellion of the Third legion. However, Elagabalus had Verus executed, dispersed the legion and stripped Tyre, where its headquarters were, of its status of metropolis.

References
 Dio Cassius, 80.7
 Herodian, 5
 "Verus" De Imperatoribus Romanis website. (accessed 6 February 2020)

219 deaths
3rd-century Roman usurpers
Year of birth unknown
Romans from unknown gentes